Kirtivarman II also known as Rahappa (reigned 746 – 753 CE)  was the last ruler in the Badami Chalukya dynasty. He succeeded his father Vikramaditya II. His reign was continuously troubled by the growing power of the Rashtrakutas and Pandyas and finally succumbed to them.

Conflict with the Pandyas

Kirtivarman and his Ganga feudatory Sripurusha came into conflict with the Pandya ruler Maravarman Rajasimha I who was extending the Pandya empire on to the Kongu country which was adjacent to the Ganga kingdom. Rajasimha crossed the Kaveri and engaged Kirtivarman and Sripurusha in a big battle at Venbai on the banks of the river Kaveri. The Chalukya king was defeated.

Diminishing power

Kirtivarman was steadily undermined by the activities of Rashtrakuta Dantidurga who was establishing the Rashtrakuta Empire. Dantidurga was a feudatory of the Chalukyas and was beginning to establish an independent kingdom around Ellora.

Dantidurga managed to wrest control of the northern provinces of the Chalukyan kingdom, he also completely surrounded the Chalukya in the east and the south by conquering the Telugu provinces, Kalinga and Kosala kingdoms. Dantidurga also went into an alliance with the Pallava Nandivarman II. Thus isolated,  Kirtivarman could not turn to any direction for help.

The final assault on Kirtivarman came in  752 and completely overwhelmed the Chalukyan kingdom.

Kirtivarman II was the last king of the Badami dynasty. There was a period of 220 years in which the western branch of the Chalukyas were in eclipse. Tailapa II revived the dynasty in 973.

References 
 Nilakanta Sastri, K.A. (1955). A History of South India, OUP, New Delhi (Reprinted 2002).
 Dr. Suryanath U. Kamat (2001). Concise History of Karnataka, MCC, Bangalore (Reprinted 2002).

750s deaths
Early Chalukyas
8th-century Indian monarchs